The Tsing Shan Monastery aka. Castle Peak Monastery is situated at the foot of Castle Peak, near Tuen Mun, Hong Kong. Parts of the Monastery are listed as Grade I historic buildings, others are listed as Grade II historic buildings.

Overview
Inside there are the Pui To Pagoda, Tsing Wan Koon and the Tsing Shan Temple. These historical monuments have stood through the ages in the tranquil wooded area. The striking and picturesque surroundings create an enjoyable view as well as a solemn ambiance. Upon entering the Monastery, the words "" (Fragrant Sea and Prestigious Mountain) will be perceived engraved on the portico. It is a caption by the former Governor Sir Cecil Clementi. On the reverse side are the words "" (Repentance is Salvation), an inscription by Reverend Tit Xim. Originating from Shiwan, the crest tile of the archway is a delicate art treasure.

Origin
According to legend, an Indian monk who liked travelling in a wooden cup was believed to have lodged where the Monastery now stands. Attracted by the natural wonders and the serene milieu, he built a chalet there for practicing meditation. Since then, the name of Reverend Pui To has become widespread. In memory of him, his followers built a pagoda at the place where he formerly resided. At the back of the pagoda was a statue of Reverend Pui To. The time of construction, however, cannot be ascertained. Some say the Pui To Pagoda was built in the Jin Dynasty and redeveloped in the Song Dynasty. Regular maintenance works has kept the historical relic's original appearance intact.

Adjoining to the Main Worship Hall is Ching Wan Koon, which is dedicated to Dou Lao, a goddess who is believed to be able to relieve people from their worries.

The Tsing Shan Temple is the eldest amongst the temples in Hong Kong. There is a main worship hall inside the temple and the writing "" (Everything on Earth Has Ties and Reaches Nirvana Together) could be seen in front of the stairs leading to the hall. The peaceful environment of this Buddhist Temple offers an abiding sense of harmony.

References

External links

 Antiquities Advisory Board. Historic Building Appraisal. Tsing Shan Monastery, "Heung Hoi Ming Shan" Pai-lau Pictures
 Antiquities Advisory Board. Historic Building Appraisal. Tsing Shan Monastery, Main Hall Pictures
 Antiquities Advisory Board. Historic Building Appraisal. Tsing Shan Monastery, Bodhisattva and Ksitigarbha Hall Pictures
 Antiquities Advisory Board. Historic Building Appraisal. Tsing Shan Monastery, Mountain Gatehouse Pictures
 Antiquities Advisory Board. Historic Building Appraisal. Tsing Shan Monastery, Hall for the Protection of the Law Pictures
 Antiquities Advisory Board. Historic Building Appraisal. Tsing Shan Monastery, Absolute Gate of the Law Pictures
 Antiquities Advisory Board. Historic Building Appraisal. Tsing Shan Monastery, Dormitory Pictures
 Antiquities Advisory Board. Historic Building Appraisal. Tsing Shan Monastery, Guest Hall Pictures
 Antiquities Advisory Board. Historic Building Appraisal. Tsing Shan Monastery, Devotee's Forest (alias Nunnery) Pictures
 Antiquities Advisory Board. Historic Building Appraisal. Tsing Shan Monastery, Kwun Yam (Goddess of Mercy) Pavilion Pictures
 Antiquities Advisory Board. Historic Building Appraisal. Tsing Shan Monastery, Hall of Merit (alias Ancestral Hall) Pictures

Buddhist monasteries in Hong Kong
Buddhist temples in Hong Kong
Grade I historic buildings in Hong Kong
Grade II historic buildings in Hong Kong
Tuen Mun District